Thailand competed at the 2004 Summer Paralympics in Athens, Greece. The team included 43 athletes, 33 men and 10 women. Competitors from Thailand won 15 medals, including 3 gold, 6 silver and 6 bronze to finish 35th in the medal table.

Medallists

Sports

Archery

Men

|-
|align=left|Wattana Martsuri
|align=left rowspan=2|Men's individual W2
|570
|23
|L 140-155
|colspan=5|did not advance
|-
|align=left|Satein Peemthon
|590
|18
|L 144-145
|colspan=5|did not advance
|}

Women

|-
|align=left|Wasana Karpmaichan
|align=left rowspan=2|Women's individual standing
|521
|12
|N/A
|W 132-108
|W 88-78
|W 87-75
|L 83-92
|
|-
|align=left|Ratchanee Panmai
|530
|9
|N/A
|W 135-116
|W 98-91
|L 75-87
|L 77-93
|4
|}

Athletics

Men's track

Men's field

Boccia

Individual events

Team

Powerlifting

Men

Women

Swimming

Wheelchair fencing

Women

Wheelchair tennis

Men

Women

See also
Thailand at the Paralympics
Thailand at the 2004 Summer Olympics

References 

Nations at the 2004 Summer Paralympics
2004
Summer Paralympics